Magic Touch is the first studio album by guitarist Stanley Jordan, released in 1985 by Blue Note Records on vinyl; a CD edition was issued in 1990.

Critical reception

Daniel Gioffre at AllMusic awarded Magic Touch 4.5 stars out of 5, calling it "An instant classic, and one of the definitive moments of modern jazz guitar." He listed "Eleanor Rigby", "The Lady in My Life", "Freddie Freeloader", "'Round Midnight", and "A Child Is Born" as highlights.

Track listing

Personnel
Stanley Jordan – guitar
Onaje Allan Gumbs – keyboard
Wayne Braithwaite – bass
Charnett Moffett – bass
Peter Erskine – drums
Omar Hakim – drums
Al Di Meola – cymbals
Sammy Figueroa – percussion
Bugsy Moore – percussion

Production
James Farber – engineer
Kenny Florendo – assistant engineer
Al Di Meola – producer
Christine Martin – producer

References

External links
Stanley Jordan Magic Touch album review at Guitar Nine

Stanley Jordan albums
1985 albums
Blue Note Records albums